Resource depletion is the consumption of a resource faster than it can be replenished. Natural resources are commonly divided between renewable resources and non-renewable resources (see also mineral resource classification). Use of either of these forms of resources beyond their rate of replacement is considered to be resource depletion. The value of a resource is a direct result of its availability in nature and the cost of extracting the resource, the more a resource is depleted the more the value of the resource increases. There are several types of resource depletion, the most known being: Aquifer depletion, deforestation, mining for fossil fuels and minerals, pollution or contamination of resources, slash-and-burn agricultural practices, soil erosion, and overconsumption, excessive or unnecessary use of resources.

Resource depletion is most commonly used in reference to farming, fishing, mining, water usage, and consumption of fossil fuels. Depletion of wildlife populations is called defaunation.

Depletion accounting 

In an effort to offset the depletion of resources, theorists have come up with the concept of depletion accounting. Better known as 'green accounting,' depletion accounting aims to account for nature's value on an equal footing with the market economy. Resource depletion accounting uses data provided from countries to estimate the adjustments needed due to their use and depletion of the natural capital available to them. Natural capital are natural resources such as mineral deposits or timber stocks. Depletion accounting factors in several different influences such as the number of years until resource exhaustion, the cost of resource extraction and the demand of the resource. Resource extraction industries make up a large part of the economic activity in developing countries. This, in turn, leads to higher levels of resource depletion and environmental degradation in developing countries. Theorists argue that implementation of resource depletion accounting is necessary in developing countries. Depletion accounting also seeks to measure the social value of natural resources and ecosystems. Measurement of social value is sought through ecosystem services, which are defined as the benefits of nature to households, communities and economies.

Importance 
There are many different groups interested in depletion accounting. Environmentalists are interested in depletion accounting as a way to track the use of natural resources over time, hold governments accountable or compare their environmental conditions to those of another country. Economists want to measure resource depletion to understand how financially reliant countries or corporations are on non-renewable resources, whether this use can be sustained and the financial drawbacks of switching to renewable resources in light of the depleting resources.

Issues  
Depletion accounting is complex to implement as nature is not as quantifiable as cars, houses, or bread. For depletion accounting to work, appropriate units of natural resources must be established so that natural resources can be viable in the market economy. The main issues that arise when trying to do so are, determining a suitable unit of account, deciding how to deal with the "collective" nature of a complete ecosystem, delineating the borderline of the ecosystem, and defining the extent of possible duplication when the resource interacts in more than one ecosystem. Some economists want to include measurement of the benefits arising from public goods provided by nature, but currently there are no market indicators of value. Globally, environmental economics has not been able to provide a consensus of measurement units of nature's services.

Minerals depletion 

Minerals are needed to provide food, clothing, and housing. A United States Geological Survey (USGS) study found a significant long-term trend over the 20th century for non-renewable resources such as minerals to supply a greater proportion of the raw material inputs to the non-fuel, non-food sector of the economy; an example is the greater consumption of crushed stone, sand, and gravel used in construction.

Large-scale exploitation of minerals began in the Industrial Revolution around 1760 in England and has grown rapidly ever since. Technological improvements have allowed humans to dig deeper and access lower grades and different types of ore over that time. Virtually all basic industrial metals (copper, iron, bauxite, etc.), as well as rare earth minerals, face production output limitations from time to time, because supply involves large up-front investments and is therefore slow to respond to rapid increases in demand.

Minerals projected by some to enter production decline during the next 20 years:

 Oil conventional (2005)
 Oil all liquides (2017). Old expectation: Gasoline (2023)
 Copper (2017). Old expectation: Copper (2024). Data from the United States Geological Survey (USGS) suggest that it is very unlikely that copper production will peak before 2040.
 Coal per KWh (2017). Old expectation per ton: (2060)
 Zinc. Developments in hydrometallurgy have transformed non-sulfide zinc deposits (largely ignored until now) into large low cost reserves.

Minerals projected by some to enter production decline during the present century:

 Aluminium (2057)
 Iron (2068)
Such projections may change, as new discoveries are made and typically misinterpret available data on Mineral Resources and Mineral Reserves.
 Phosphor (2048). The last 80% of World reserves are only one mine.

Petroleum

Deforestation

Controlling deforestation

Wetlands 
Wetlands are ecosystems that are often saturated by enough surface or groundwater to sustain vegetation that is usually adapted to saturated soil conditions, such as cattails, bulrushes, red maples, wild rice, blackberries, cranberries, and peat moss. Because some varieties of wetlands are rich in minerals and nutrients and provide many of the advantages of both land and water environments they contain diverse species and provide a distinct basis for the food chain. Wetland habitats contribute to environmental health and biodiversity. Wetlands are a nonrenewable resource on a human timescale and in some environments cannot ever be renewed. Recent studies indicate that global loss of wetlands could be as high as 87% since 1700 AD, with 64% of wetland loss occurring since 1900. Some loss of wetlands resulted from natural causes such as erosion, sedimentation, subsidence, and a rise in the sea level.

Wetlands provide environmental services for:

 Food and habitat
 Improving water quality
 Commercial fishing
 Floodwater reduction
 Shoreline stabilization
 Recreation

Resource in wetland 
Some of the world's most successful agricultural areas are wetlands that have been drained and converted to farmland for large-scale agriculture. Large-scale draining of wetlands also occurs for real estate development and urbanization. In contrast, in some cases wetlands are also flooded to be converted to recreational lakes or hydropower generation. In some countries ranchers have also moved their property onto wetlands for grazing due to the nutrient rich vegetation. Wetlands in Southern America also prove a fruitful resource for poachers, as animals with valuable hides such a jaguars, maned wolves, caimans, and snakes are drawn to wetlands. The effect of the removal of large predators is still unknown in South African wetlands.  

Humans benefit from wetlands in indirect ways as well. Wetlands act as natural water filters, when runoff from either natural or man-made processes pass through, wetlands can have a neutralizing effect. If a wetland is in between an agricultural zone and a freshwater ecosystem, fertilizer runoff will be absorbed by the wetland and used to fuel the slow processes that occur happen, by the time the water reaches the freshwater ecosystem there won't be enough fertilizer to cause destructive algal blooms that poison freshwater ecosystems.

Non-natural causes of wetland degradation 

Hydrologic alteration 
drainage
dredging
stream channelization
ditching
levees
deposition of fill material
stream diversion
groundwater drainage
impoundment
Urbanization and urban development
Marinas/boats
Industrialization and industrial development
Agriculture
Silviculture/Timber harvest
Mining
Atmospheric deposition

To preserve the resources extracted from wetlands, current strategies are to rank wetlands and prioritize the conservation of wetlands with more environmental services, create more efficient irrigation for wetlands being used for agriculture and restricting access to wetlands by tourists.

Groundwater 

Water is an essential resource needed to survive everyday life. Historically, water has had a profound influence on a nation's prosperity and success around the world. Groundwater is water that is in saturated zones underground, the upper surface of the saturated zone is called the water table. Groundwater is held in the pores and fractures of underground materials like sand, gravel and other rock, these rock materials are called aquifers. Groundwater can either flow naturally out of rock materials or can be pumped out. Groundwater supplies wells and aquifers for private, agricultural, and public use and is used by more than a third of the world's population every day for their drinking water. Globally there is 22.6 million cubic kilometers of groundwater available and only .35 million of that is renewable.

Groundwater as a non-renewable resource 
Groundwater is considered to be a non-renewable resource because less than six percent of the water around the world is replenished and renewed on a human timescale of 50 years. People are already using non-renewable water that is thousands of years old, in areas like Egypt they are using water that may have been renewed a million years ago which is not renewable on human timescales. Of the groundwater used for agriculture 16 to 33% is non-renewable. It is estimated that since the 1960s groundwater extraction has more than doubled, which has increased groundwater depletion. Due to this increase in depletion, in some of the most depleted areas use of groundwater for irrigation has become impossible or cost prohibitive.

Environmental impacts 
Overusing groundwater, old or young, can lower subsurface water levels and dry up streams, which could have a huge effect on ecosystems on the surface. When the most easily recoverable fresh groundwater is removed this leaves a residual with inferior water quality. This is in part from induced leakage from the land surface, confining layers or adjacent aquifers that contain saline or contaminated water. Worldwide the magnitude of groundwater depletion from storage may be so large as to constitute a measurable contributor to sea-level rise.

Mitigation 
Currently, societies respond to water-resource depletion by shifting management objectives from location and developing new supplies to augmenting conserving and reallocation of existing supplies. There are two different perspectives to groundwater depletion, the first is that depletion is considered literally and simply as a reduction in the volume of water in the saturated zone, regardless of water quality considerations. A second perspective views depletion as a reduction in the usable volume of fresh groundwater in storage.

Augmenting supplies can mean improving water quality or increasing water quantity. Depletion due to quality considerations can be overcome by treatment, whereas large volume metric depletion can only be alleviated by decreasing discharge or increasing recharge. Artificial recharge of storm flow and treated municipal wastewater, has successfully reversed groundwater declines. In the future improved infiltration and recharge technologies will be more widely used to maximize the capture of runoff and treated wastewater.

Resource scarcity as a moral problem
Researchers who produced an update of the Club of Rome's Limits to Growth report find that many people deny the existence of the problem of scarcity, including many leading scientists and politicians. This may be due, for example, to an unwillingness to change one's own consumption patterns or to share scarce natural resources more equally, or to a psychological defence mechanism.

The scarcity of resources raises a central moral problem concerning the distribution and allocation of natural resources. Competition means that the most advanced get the most resources, which often means the developed West. The problem here is that the West has developed partly through colonial slave labour and violence and partly through protectionist policies, which together have left many countries underdeveloped. The moral problem is, in the light of such a history, which has made different countries differently developed and competitive, can competition be considered to distribute resources in a fair and equitable way?

In the future, international cooperation in sharing scarce resources will become increasingly important. Where scarcity is concentrated on the non-renewable resources that play the most important role in meeting needs, the most essential element for the realisation of human rights is an adequate and equitable allocation of scarcity. Inequality, taken to its extreme, causes intense discontent, which can lead to social unrest and even armed conflict. Many experts believe that ensuring equitable development is the only sure way to a peaceful distribution of scarcity.

Another approach to resource depletion is a combined process of deresourcification and resourcification where one strives to putting an end to the social processes of turning into resources what is unsustainable, for example, non-renewable natural resources, and develop instead processes of turning sustainable things into resources, for example, renewable human resources.

See also 

 Ecological economics
 Holocene extinction
 Jevons paradox
 Limits to Growth
 Overexploitation
 Overfishing
 Overpopulation
 Peak coal
 Peak copper
 Peak gas
 Peak gold
 Peak minerals
 Peak phosphorus
 Peak uranium
 Peak water
 Peak wheat
 Planetary boundaries
 Progress trap
 Scarcity

References

Further reading
 Grandin, Greg, "The Death Cult of Trumpism:  In his appeals to a racist and nationalist chauvinism, Trump leverages tribal resentment against an emerging manifest common destiny", The Nation, 29 Jan./5 Feb. 2018, pp. 20–22.  "[T]he ongoing effects of the ruinous 2003 war in Iraq and the 2007–8 financial meltdown are... two indicators that the promise of endless growth can no longer help organize people's aspirations...  We are entering the second 'lost decade' of what Larry Summers calls 'secular stagnation,' and soon we'll be in the third decade of a war that Senator Lindsey Graham... says will never end.  [T]here is a realization that the world is fragile and that we are trapped in an economic system that is well past sustainable or justifiable.... In a nation like the United States, founded on a mythical belief in a kind of species immunity—less an American exceptionalism than exemptionism, an insistence that the nation was exempt from nature, society, history, even death—the realization that it can't go on forever is traumatic." (p. 21.)

Resource economics
Environmental issues